Connor Barley is a rugby league footballer who plays as a er for York Knights in the RFL Championship, on season long loan from Hull Kingston Rovers in the Betfred Super League.

In 2022 he made his Super League début against St Helens.

References

2004 births
Living people
English rugby league players
Hull Kingston Rovers players
Rugby league wingers
York City Knights players